There are at least 10 bodies of water in the U.S. state of Oregon named Muddy Creek and many more derivations of it:

See also 
 List of rivers of Oregon
 List of lakes in Oregon

References 

Rivers of Oregon
Oregon geography-related lists